Malik Ghulam Nabi (1909-2009) was a Pakistani politician who served as the Punjab Minister for Education in 1970 and 1977. He was also the member of the Provincial Assembly of the Punjab in 1970 and 1977.

References

Punjab MPAs 1972–1977
Punjab MPAs 1977
Provincial ministers of Punjab
Pakistan People's Party MPAs (Punjab)
2009 deaths
1909 births